The Lok Sabha Secretariat is an independent office of Lok Sabha which functions under advise of the Speaker of Lok Sabha. 

In the discharge of his constitutional and statutory responsibilities, the Speaker of the Lok Sabha is assisted by the Secretary-General, Lok Sabha, (whose pay scale, position and  status etc. is equivalent to  that of the highest-ranking official in the Government of India i.e. Cabinet Secretary), functionaries of the level of the Additional Secretary, Joint Secretary and other officers and staff of the Secretariat at various levels.

The Secretary General remains in office till his/her retirement at the age of 60. He/she is answerable only to the Speaker, his action cannot be discussed or criticised in or outside the Lok Sabha.

On behalf of the President of India, he summons members to attend session of Parliament and authenticates bills in the absence of the Speaker.

References

Lok Sabha